The Women's Party (Korean: 여성의당) is a South Korean single-issue political party founded on International Women's Day 2020 that advocates for feminism. The party calls for greater representation of women and equality in politics and an end to all forms of violence, discrimination and inequality against women in the workplace.

History

The conflict between Feminism Party 
The annexation between Feminism Party (페미니즘당) which is intersectional feminism and Women's Party which is trans-exclusive radical feminism were foundered because of its characters. A column wrote on Women's Human Rights Institute of Korea (Korean) which criticized gender-exclusive feminism was the reason of the conflict.

Establishment 
The Women's Party was officially established on March 8, 2020 on International Women's Day. The new electoral system which expanded the opportunities for minority parties, prompted the movement to establish a Women's party spearheaded by active young and senior feminists. In 10 days, the organizers were able to qualify the group to register as an official political party. On the Inauguration day, Kim Eun-joo, Yoon Seo-yeon, Lee Ji-won, Won So-yoo, Chang Ji-yoo, Kim Jin-ah, and Lee Seong Suk were selected as the first joint representatives to represent the diverse age brackets of their female constituents.

2020 South Korean general elections 
The Women's Party’s 10 major pledges addressed issues such as closing the gender pay gap, women’s housing rights, reducing the burden of childcare, right to health etc., and prioritized curbing digital sexual crimes.

The party nominated four candidates for proportional representation: Lee Ji Won (First and second party representative), Lee Gyeong Ok (Chairperson of the South Gyeongsang Provincial Party), Park Bo Ram, Kim Ju Hee.

With 208,697 (0.74%) votes during its first election, the party came in 10th among parties who won seats in proportional representation.

Party convention 2020 
Following the general elections, the Women's Party held a virtual party convention on September 5 amid Covid-19. Lee Ji-won, Chang Ji-yoo, and Kim Jin-ah were newly elected as the second representatives.

Seoul mayoral by-election 2021 
Seoul mayor Park Won-soon died by suicide July 9, 2020, the day after his former secretary filed a complaint to the police alleging that Park had sexually harassed her.

Two candidates, Kim Jin-ah and Lee Ji-won, former and current co-representatives, ran in the party's primary, and Kim Jin-ah was elected. Candidate Kim Jin-ah emphasized that "the election was caused by the sexual misconduct case of the late former Seoul Mayor Park Won-soon," and pledged a 50% quota of female executives at public institutions under the slogan "Seoul where women are good to live alone."

Dissolution crisis 
The Women's Party did not run any candidates for the 2022 local elections or the 2022 presidential election. On 5 September 2022, The Women's Party announced on the party's website that a vote for the dissolution of the party would be held. The Women's Party has been experiencing difficulties in running the party for over a year as many members left and key positions in the Party went unfilled. There were no Party members that applied to run in local elections for the 2022 election cycle. The election of the third steering committee was also canceled in July 2022 due to no applicants.

In December 2021, internal strife grew when it was revealed that Party leader Jang Ji-yu was handling the party affairs via 'Tarot card fortune-telling' and using her job as a fortune teller to influence the choices of party members in key party elections.

On 1 October 2022, the Women's Party announced that the vote to dissolve the Party passed consensus by Party members. However, according to Korean law, a vote must obtain 50% of registered voter participation in order to be considered valid. Even though the vote to dissolve the Party resulted in a majority "yes" vote, the Women's Party did not reach the 50% participation threshold of party members, and thus the vote was invalidated.

Policies 
As a single-issue party, its main policies include:

 Guarantee equal representation for women by building a more gender equal representative democracy
 Create a nation that safeguards women from violence and hate
 Build a society without socio-economic discrimination against women, and with equal access to labor · equal treatment for equivalent labor
 Recognize women’s contributions to family life and reproduction. Develop and implement policies that guarantee the rights, autonomy, and welfare of women.
 Implement gender equal welfare policies centered on the rights of individual citizens by moving away from the paradigm of current welfare policies that institute the concept of the normative family
 Eliminate all forms of discrimination and privilege that deprive women of equal opportunity
 Develop a creative society that guarantees a culture of equality and an individual’s right to enjoy this culture
 Represent the voice and experience of female sexual minorities
 Build peace through eradication of patriarchal military culture
 Proactively respond to future issues such as technological development and climate change from a feminist standpoint

Political position 
Unlike mainstream feminist political parties that range from center-left to left-wing political positions, the Women's Party is big tent with members ranging from conservatives to progressives. The Women's Party focuses on broadening female representation, actualizing gender equality in politics, and fighting against inequality women experience at different stages of their lives. In order to accomplish the party's agenda, the Women's Party actively collaborates with various other political parties such as the Democratic Party of Korea, Justice Party, Basic Income Party, Green Party Korea and organizations such as 모두를위한낙태죄폐지공동행동 (Safe Abortion On Korea), 양육비해결총연합회 (Resolve Child Support Problem Union), and 배드파더스 (Bad fathers).

The Women's Party has also been publicly criticized after its 2021 Seoul Mayor Candidate, Kim Jin-Ah, made comments during a televised debate that is seen as downplaying homophobia towards gay men, saying "women suffer more than homosexuals" and that "a homosexual man is still a man," and "gay [men] earn 16% more wage than women."

The Women's Party is member of Women's Declaration International which advocates for radical feminist ideologies. The Women's Party holds that women are female and rejects the notion of gender identity-based rights in favor of sex-based rights, a position that has been criticized as transphobic.

Election results

General elections

Local elections

See also 
 Political parties in South Korea
 Feminism in South Korea
 Women in South Korea

References

External links 

 Official website (in Korean)
 Official website (in English)

Feminist organizations in South Korea
Feminist parties
Political parties in South Korea
Political parties established in 2020
Radical feminist organizations
Discrimination against transgender people
Discrimination against LGBT people in South Korea
Single-issue political parties
Women's rights in South Korea
2020 establishments in South Korea
Organizations that oppose transgender rights